Cime du Gélas (Italian: Monte Gelàs) is a 3,143 m high mountain on the boundary between France (Provence-Alpes-Côte d'Azur region) and Italy (province of Cuneo). It is part of the Maritime Alps.

It is the highest peak of the Mercantour National Park, while on the Italian side it is included in the Maritime Alps Natural Park. Geologically, it is part of the Mercantour-Argentera massif, and is mostly formed by granitoid gneiss. The peak is composed of two smaller ones, divided by a gorge; the highest peak is the northern one, which is topped by a cross built here by priests from Cuneo.

The mountain's name derives from the glaciers which occupy its northern slopes, which have however reduced substantially during the late 20th century.

References

Maps
 Italian official cartography (Istituto Geografico Militare - IGM); on-line version: www.pcn.minambiente.it
 French  official cartography (Institut Géographique National - IGN); on-line version:  www.geoportail.fr

External links
 Geologic map 

Mercantour National Park
Gelas
Gelas
Gelas
Province of Cuneo
France–Italy border
Gelas
Gelas
Mountains partially in France
Highest points of French national parks